The Borden Building is a 438 ft (134m) tall skyscraper located at 180 East Broad Street in Columbus, Ohio, United States. It was topped out on May 9, 1973, and completed the next year. Harrison & Abramovitz designed the building following a modernist architectural style.  The building has 34 floors and is the 9th tallest in Columbus. It also has 52,842 m² of floor space. Current building tenants include Deloitte, Hexion, OhioHealth, Washington Prime Group, the Ohio Secretary of State, and the Public Utilities Commission of Ohio.

See also
List of tallest buildings in Columbus

References
Emporis
Skyscraperpage

External links
 

Skyscraper office buildings in Columbus, Ohio
Buildings in downtown Columbus, Ohio
Office buildings completed in 1974
Harrison & Abramovitz buildings
Broad Street (Columbus, Ohio)